Arthur Blok (ארתור בלוק; March 19, 1882 – October 14, 1974) was the British-born first administrative head (or Principal, as he was then called) of the Technion – Israel Institute of Technology, in Haifa, Israel (then Mandatory Palestine), from 1924–1925.

Biography
Blok was born in Hornsey, North London, and attended Owen's School. He was an electrical engineering graduate of University College London (BSc). He was personal assistant to Professor Ambrose Fleming.

Blok was the first administrative head (or Principal, as he was then called) of the Technion, from 1924–1925. He was succeeded by Max Hecker.

He was appointed OBE in 1945. Blok died on 14 October 1974, aged  94.

References 

1882 births
1974 deaths
Academic staff of Technion – Israel Institute of Technology
Technion – Israel Institute of Technology presidents
Alumni of University College London
People from Hornsey
English electrical engineers
Officers of the Order of the British Empire
British people in Mandatory Palestine